Porfiri Artemyevich Podobed (— 9 November 1965) was a Soviet film director, actor and manager at the Moscow Art Theatre.

Early life 
Porfiri Podobed came from a Russian Orthodox family of Artemy Podobed and Elena Fyodorovna Karry (1868–1932), a well-known opera singer at the Bolshoi Theatre and a stepsister of Vasily and Vladimir Nemirovich-Danchenko. In 1910 Porfiri finished the Sea Cadet Corps in Saint Petersburg in the rank of michman. As a Gardes-Marine he took part in the 1908 Messina earthquake rescue and was awarded for it. He was promoted to lieutenant in 1912.

In 1915 Podobed joined the World War I. He served aboard the Gangut battleship and took part in the Gulf of Finland mining for which he was awarded the 3rd class Order of Saint Stanislaus. On 19 October a mutiny happened among the lower ranking members which led to an investigation and a trial. According to the memoirs of one of the rebels, Dmitry Ivanov, Podobed was relieved of duty for expressing support to the sailors, but was later restored and returned to war. Ivanov also claimed that Podobed helped underground revolutionaries. Following the October Revolution he took part in the Russian Civil War and served in the Soviet Navy headquarters under Aleksandr Nemits.

Career 
In 1918 Podobed took a managing position at the Moscow Art Theatre headed by his relative Vladimir Nemirovich-Danchenko. He left it in 1919, but regained in 1921 following the demobilization and worked there up until 1926. He was one of the founders of the MKhAT Museum. His correspondence with Nemirovich-Danchenko contains many important facts about the theatre life during the New Economic Policy. Also in 1918 Podobed performed his first role in the Swamp Mirages drama movie directed by Victor Tourjansky and based on the Swamp Lights novel by Vasily Nemirovich-Danchenko. The film was released only in 1923 and is considered lost today.

In 1919 Podobed joined the Moscow Film School and then — the famous Kuleshov's Collective headed by Lev Kuleshov where he studied cinematography along with Vsevolod Pudovkin, Boris Barnet, Vladimir Fogel and other acclaimed actors/directors. Kuleshov highly regarded his discipline and commitment, and in 1924 he gave Podobed the leading role of a goofy American John West in one of the first Soviet comedies The Extraordinary Adventures of Mr. West in the Land of the Bolsheviks. He later performed in several other movies by Kuleshov.

In 1929 Vsevolod Meyerhold decided to make his directorial debut with Eugeny Bazarov, a film adaptation of the Fathers and Sons novel by Ivan Turgenev. He invited Podobed to be his assistant. The troubled pre-production lasted for three years, and the movie was finally abandoned.

From 1930 to 1943 Podobed worked predominately with Yakov Protazanov, first as a camera assistant and then — as an assistant director and a co-director. From 1942 on he worked at Mosnauchfilm (known as Voentechfilm during the World War II) dedicated to popular science and educational films. He also taught filmmaking from 1920 to 1939.

Death 
Porfiri Podobed died on 9 November 1965 aged 79. He was buried at the Moscow Armenian Cemetery near his mother Elena Karry and his wife :fr:Lydia Redega (Lydia Konstantinovna Redega-Podobed (1888–1946)), a ballerina and ballet master at the Moscow Art Theatre Musical Studio.

Filmography

References

External links 

1886 births
1965 deaths
20th-century Russian male actors
Gerasimov Institute of Cinematography alumni
Moscow Art Theatre
Recipients of the Order of Saint Stanislaus (Russian), 3rd class
Russian documentary filmmakers
Russian film directors
Russian male film actors
Russian male silent film actors
Russian military personnel of World War I
Russian Navy personnel
Silent film directors
Soviet documentary film directors
Soviet film directors
Soviet male film actors
Soviet male silent film actors
Soviet military personnel of the Russian Civil War
Naval Cadet Corps alumni